Luohu North station is a station of Shenzhen Metro Line 14. It opened on 28 October 2022.

Station layout

Exits

Gallery

References

External links
 Shenzhen Metro Luohu North Station (Chinese)
 Shenzhen Metro Luohu North Station (English)

Railway stations in Guangdong
Shenzhen Metro stations
Luohu District
Railway stations in China opened in 2022